The 2010 Zing Trofeo Abarth 500 GB season was the inaugural edition of the series. It began at Oulton Park on 5 April and finished after seven events at Autodromo Nazionale Monza on 24 October. The championship was won by Ben Winrow, driving for Team Pyro. The team title was won by Mardigras motorsport. The championship was organised and managed by the company CTC (calleatechcenter) Ltd. The series was launched on 22 October in Silverstone, where six 500 AC (assetto corsa) race cars were presented to the press and competitors. The championship was contested over seven rounds, each composed by two races. The championship calendar was composed by different events: British GT, Formula 2, British superbike, Lotus festival, DTM, Silverstone Classic and the Italian Ferrari Challenge. The permit holder was MSVR. The manager of the series was Paolo Callea, previous British GT manager.

Teams and drivers
All drivers competed in Abarth 500 Assetto Corses. Guest drivers in italics.

Calendar and winners

Combination event with the European & Italian series.

Championship standings
Points were awarded on a 21, 18, 16, 14, 12, 10, 8, 6, 4, 3, 2, 1 basis to the top 12 finishers in each race, with one bonus point for the fastest lap in each race. A driver's six best weekend scores counted towards the championship. Dropped scores are shown in brackets.

Abarth 500 Celebrity Challenge
A celebrity race was held on the Friday of the Silverstone Classic meeting in aid of the CRUK Bobby Moore Fund. It was won by Rick Parfitt Jr.

External links
Series website
Organiser website

Trofeo Abarth 500 GB